Serachaur सेराचौर is a village which is located in Kaski District, Gandaki Province, Nepal. The word Sera refers to a plain land which is used to farm and supply food to a palace and Chaur means a grassy land. First settlers of this village were Adhikari Family. It is a part of the Annapurna Gaunpalika ward number- 2, Kaski, Nepal. Pastly the village was part of Dhikurpokhari V.D.C but later the Ministry of Federal Affairs and Local Development (Nepal) dissolved the existing village development committees and announced the establishment of this new local body. Visitors can take the Baglung Highway, Kaskikot road and other existing trails to reach here. Concrete pavement is recent installation to the road.

Literacy 
Serachaur has good iconic representation around the area. The literacy rate of this village is at good number. There is one Lower Secondary School named Durgabhawani Aadarsha Secondary School in Serachaur. This school is English-Medium, community-based. Two major building of school occupies at the lower part of village ( Deuthape ) and other at central. The central building has Montessori and other has Lower-Secondary. After completing lower-secondary education students reach other Secondary schools primarily at Naudada or Pokhara. Local people from this village supported the development and progress of the school. Scholarship and financial aid are given to promising students who need assistance. Serachaur is called as the land of educated people of this area.

Geography 

Serachaur resides at the west hills of Pokhara. Village is bounded by other small villages Saurini and Thulachaur.  Water flowing from Adheri Khola and Harpan Khola makes up the major river of this area which further connects to Phewa Lake.

Houses 
Houses of this village are very closed and made by stone and wood. House architecture at this village has changed time to time, structure till today is primarily the traditional roof shaped and rectangular but today people are focused more on renovating or rebuilding their houses with use of cement and steel roof.

Agriculture 
The village is famous for fresh farming. Main crops such as rice, paddy, wheat, maize, millet and many other traditional crops are cultivated here. Locally produced agricultural products are the major source of food. The production of agriculture depends on the seasonal rains and climate. Rice is important cereal crop. Villagers rely on the monsoon rain for the Rice cultivation. Locals also supply fresh grains, organic vegetables, meat-products and milk to neighboring areas. Villagers still follow the traditional agricultural methods. There are also a few poultry farms.

Ethnic groups 
The majority of people living in Serachaur are Brahmins and a fews are Damai and Kami. Many of them are from the Adhikari family, others from Bhandari, Dahals. There are a very few families of Pariyars, Gharti and Biswokarma.

Tourism 
The entire Pokhara valley can be seen from here, as well as small rivers and part of Annapurna. As for now there are no any Hotels or Lodges around this area. The recently built Krishi-Road Agricultural-Road reach up to Paudurkot or maybe further. Serachaur is also alternate trek route for Panchase.

References

Populated places in Kaski District